, also referred to as , is one of the Japan Railways Group (JR Group) companies and operates in western Honshu. It has its headquarters in Kita-ku, Osaka. It is listed in the Tokyo Stock Exchange, is a constituent of the TOPIX Large70 index, and is also one of only three Japan Railways Group constituents of the Nikkei 225 index: the others are JR East and JR Central. It was also listed in the Nagoya and Fukuoka stock exchanges until late 2020.

Lines

Shinkansen
 Hokuriku Shinkansen ( - )
 San'yō Shinkansen
 Hakata Minami Line
 Officially not a Shinkansen
JR-West's highest-grossing line is the Sanyo Shinkansen high-speed rail line between Osaka and Fukuoka. The Sanyo Shinkansen alone accounts for about 40% of JR-West's passenger revenues. The company also operates Hakata Minami Line, a short commuter line with Shinkansen trains in Fukuoka.

Urban Network
The "Urban Network" is JR-West's name for its commuter rail lines in the Osaka-Kobe-Kyoto metropolitan area. These lines together comprise 610 km of track, have 245 stations and account for about 43% of JR-West's passenger revenues. Urban Network stations are equipped to handle ICOCA fare cards. Train control on these lines is highly automated, and during peak hours trains run as often as every two minutes.

JR-West's Urban Network competes with a number of private commuter rail operators around Osaka, the "Big 4" being Hankyu Railway/Hanshin Railway (Hankyu bought Hanshin in April 2005), Keihan Railway, Kintetsu, and Nankai Railway. JR-West's market share in the region is roughly equal to that of the Big 4 put together, largely due to its comprehensive network and high-speed commuter trains (Special Rapid Service trains on the Kobe and Kyoto lines operate at up to 130 km/h).

Those in italics are announcement names.
Akō Line
Biwako Line
Officially Tōkaidō Main Line, Hokuriku Main Line
Gakkentoshi Line
Officially Katamachi Line
Hanwa Line
Kansai Airport Line
JR Kobe Line
Officially Tōkaidō Main Line, San'yō Main Line
Kosei Line
JR Kyoto Line
Officially Tōkaidō Main Line
Nara Line
Osaka Loop Line
Osaka Higashi Line
Sagano Line
Officially San'in Main Line
Man-yo Mahoroba Line
Officially Sakurai Line
JR Takarazuka Line
Officially Fukuchiyama Line
JR Tōzai Line
Yamatoji Line
Officially Kansai Main Line
Wakayama Line
JR Yumesaki Line
Officially Sakurajima Line

Intercity and regional lines
A number of other lines account for more than half of JR-West's track mileage. These lines mainly handle business and leisure travel between smaller cities and rural areas in western Japan. They account for about 20% of the company's passenger revenues.

Intercity lines

Fukuchiyama Line
Includes JR Takarazuka Line.
Hakubi Line
Hokuriku Main Line
Includes Biwako Line.
Honshi-Bisan Line, Chayamachi — Kojima
Nicknamed Seto-Ōhashi Line
Kansai Main Line, Kameyama — JR Namba
Includes Yamatoji Line.
Kisei Main Line, Shingū — Wakayamashi
Includes Kinokuni Line.
San'in Main Line
Includes Sagano Line.
San'yō Main Line, Kobe — Shimonoseki, Hyōgo — Wadamisaki.
Includes JR Kobe Line.
Takayama Main Line, Inotani — Toyama
Tōkaidō Main Line, Maibara — Kobe
Includes Biwako Line, JR Kyoto Line, and JR Kobe Line.

Regional lines

Bantan Line
Etsumi-Hoku Line
Nicknamed Kuzuryū Line
Fukuen Line
Gantoku Line
Geibi Line
Himi Line
Imbi Line
Jōhana Line
Kabe Line
Kakogawa Line
Kibi Line
Kishin Line
Kisuki Line
Kure Line
Includes Setouchi Sazanami Line
Kusatsu Line
Maizuru Line
Mine Line
Nanao Line
Obama Line
Ōito Line, Minami-Otari — Itoigawa
Onoda Line
Sakai Line
Tsuyama Line
Ube Line
Uno Line
Yamaguchi Line

Other businesses 
JR-West subsidiaries include the following.

 West Japan Railway Hotel Development Company - Owns Hotel Granvia Kyoto, Hotel Granvia Osaka, Hotel Granvia Wakayama, Hotel Granvia Okayama, Hotel Granvia Hiroshima, Nara Hotel, Sannomiya Terminal Hotel and Hotel Hopinn Aming
 West Japan Railway Isetan - A joint venture with Isetan Mitsukoshi Holdings Ltd; operates the Isetan department store in Kyoto Station
 West JR Bus Company - Intercity bus operator
 Chūgoku JR Bus Company - Intercity bus operator
 Japan Railway West Trading Co.
 Nippon Travel Agency Co., Ltd
 Sagano Scenic Railway
 JR-West Miyajima Ferry Company - operator of JR Miyajima Ferry service to the island of Miyajima

History
JR-West was incorporated as a business corporation (kabushiki kaisha) on April 1, 1987 as part of the breakup of the state-owned Japanese National Railways (JNR). Initially, it was a wholly owned subsidiary of the JNR Settlement Corporation (JNRSC), a special company created to hold the assets of the former JNR while they were shuffled among the new JR companies.

For the first four years of its existence, JR-West leased its highest-revenue line, the Sanyō Shinkansen, from the separate Shinkansen Holding Corporation. JR-West purchased the line in October 1991 at a cost of 974.1 billion JPY (about US$7.2 billion) in long-term debt.

JNRSC sold 68.3% of JR-West in an initial public offering on the Tokyo Stock Exchange in October 1996. After JNRSC was dissolved in October 1998, its shares of JR-West were transferred to the government-owned Japan Railway Construction Public Corporation (JRCC), which merged into the Japan Railway Construction, Transport and Technology Agency (JRTT) as part of a bureaucratic reform package in October 2003. JRTT offered all of its shares in JR-West to the public in an international IPO in 2004, ending the era of government ownership of JR-West. JR-West is now listed on the Tokyo Stock Exchange, Nagoya Stock Exchange, Osaka Securities Exchange and Fukuoka Stock Exchange.

Accidents and incidents

Shigaraki train disaster A collision between a JR West and a Shigaraki Kōgen Railway train in Shigaraki (now Koka), Shiga Prefecture on 14 May 1991, killed 42 people.

Amagasaki derailment A train derailment in Amagasaki, Hyōgo Prefecture on 25 April 2005, killed 107 people.

References

External links

 

 
Companies based in Osaka Prefecture
Railway companies established in 1987
Companies listed on the Osaka Exchange
Companies listed on the Tokyo Stock Exchange
Companies listed on the Fukuoka Stock Exchange
Japanese companies established in 1987